Haig may refer to:

Places
Haig Avenue, football stadium in Southport, England
Haig, British Columbia, settlement in British Columbia, Canada
Haig, Nebraska, a community in the United States
Haig Point Club, private community on Daufuskie Island, South Carolina
Haig-Thomas Island, one of the Sverdrup Islands in Qikiqtaaluk Region, Nunavut, Canada
Mount Haig-Brown, mountain on Vancouver Island, British Columbia
The Haig, a jazz club in Hollywood

Companies and organizations
Haig Fund, British charity set up in 1921 more properly the Earl Haig Fund charity
Haig Homes, a British charity founded in 1928 to provide housing for ex-servicemen
Earl Haig Fund Scotland, Scottish charity founded in 1921

People

Mononym
Hayk (also transliterated as Haik or Haig or Haig Nahabed), Armenian Patriarch

Given name
Haig Acterian, pen name Mihail (1904–c. 1943), Romanian-Armenian film and theater director, critic, dramatist, poet, journalist, and fascist political activist
Haig H. Kazazian Jr.  (1937-2022), American professor
Haig Mardirosian (born 1947), American-Armenian academician and Dean Emeritus
Haig Oundjian (born 1949), English-Armenian figure skater
Haig Papazian, Lebanese-Armenian violinist and member of the Lebanese alternative rock band Mashrou' Leila
Haig Patigian (1876–1950), Armenian-American sculptor
Haig Sare (born 1982), Australian rugby union player
Haig Tchamitch, American bridge player
Haig Tiriakian (1871–1915), Armenian politician and a member of the Armenian National Assembly
Haig Yazdjian, Armenian-Syrian composer, vocalist and oud player, producer
Haig Young (born 1928), Canadian politician

Middle name
Ben-hur Haig Bagdikian (1920-2016), Armenian-American journalist
William Haig Brown (1823–1907), English cleric and reforming headmaster
James Haig Ferguson (1862–1934), Scottish gynaecologist

Surname
Haig (surname)

Titles
Earl Haig, Peerage of the United Kingdom
Clan Haig

Other uses
Haig-Simons income, measure of economic income also known as Schanz-Haig-Simons income
Haig Point Range Lights, navigational range lights on Calibogue Sound at Daufuskie Island in Beaufort County, South Carolina
Haig (whisky), a brand of Scotch whisky
 The Haigs, a 1960's Dutch band that featured Barry Hay

See also
Hague (disambiguation)
Haigh (disambiguation)
Hogue (disambiguation)
Haik (disambiguation)